BlazBlue is a fighting video game series developed and published in Japan by Arc System Works, and later localized in North America by Aksys Games and in Europe by Zen United. An anime adaptation aired in Autumn 2013. The series has sold 1.7 million copies since August 2012.

Games

Main series

Updated versions

Spin-offs

Other media

Novels

Manga

Anime

Other

Characters

The main BlazBlue series iterated its roster with each new game release, growing the playable cast from 10 characters from the arcade release of Calamity Trigger to 36 characters after development concluded with Central Fiction. Several BlazBlue characters have made appearances on game crossovers and other associated media.

Events and merchandise
A variety of posters, artbooks, apparel, and figurines were produced. On February 11, 2017, Arc System Works announced a collaboration with Tecmo Koei's Team Ninja to release Arc System Works Costume Set consisting the costumes of some characters from BlazBlue and Guilty Gear series in March 2017 for Dead or Alive 5: Last Round.

References

External links
 

 
2D fighting games
Arc System Works franchises
Dystopian video games
Fighting video games by series
Shōnen manga
Video game franchises introduced in 2008
Video games adapted into television shows